Adrian Amstutz (born 2 December 1953) is a Swiss politician. He was a member of the Swiss National Council from the Canton of Berne from 2003 to 2019.

Life

Amstutz was born and lives in the rural village of Sigriswil. As a young man, he served in the elite parachute reconnaissance unit of the Swiss Air Force and won the 1978 Parachuting World Cup in the parachuting/giant slalom combination discipline. Trained as an architectural draftsman and head mason, he had to abandon plans for an academic education after marrying his girlfriend, and founded his own construction planning company instead.

Career

In 1993, Amstutz entered politics as mayor of Sigriswil, joining the conservative Swiss People's Party (SVP). In 1998, he was elected to the Grand Council of Bern. He joined the National Council in 2003 and was re-elected in the 2007 elections, garnering more votes than any other candidate in the canton. In 2011, he won a close runoff by-election against the Social Democratic candidate, Ursula Wyss, to succeed Simonetta Sommaruga in the upper chamber, the Council of States. He failed to defend this seat in the general election later that year, but was elected again to the National Council.

Unlike most of his colleagues from the Bernese branch of the SVP prior to the spin-off of the Conservative Democratic Party, Amstutz's politics match the far-right course of the national party, which in 2007 caused him to be considered as a potential candidate for the Swiss Federal Council.

References

External links

Personal website 

1953 births
Living people
Members of the Council of States (Switzerland)
Swiss People's Party politicians